Tau Alpha Pi is a scholastic honor society that recognizes academic achievement among students in the field of engineering technology.

Tau Alpha Pi honor society has 85 chapters across the United States, and a total membership of approximately 7,000. Additionally, the society has always been open to both associate and bachelor degree candidates.

Tau Alpha Pi is one of the most selective honor societies in the United States, only inviting the top four percent of an institution’s total engineering technology enrollment.

History
The society was founded at Southern Polytechnic State University in 1953 by professor Jesse DeFore, and admitted to the Association of College Honor Societies in 2000. It was managed for over 30 years by engineering technology educator Frederick J. Berger who saw it dramatically transform into a viable national honor society. In honor of Berger's commitment to Tau Alpha Pi and to engineering technology education, the American Society for Engineering Education, which took over the management of Tau Alpha Pi in 1997, presents a yearly award in his name.

Mission
The purpose of Tau Alpha Pi is twofold. First, to recognize high standards of scholarship among students in engineering technology program. Secondly, to promote and encourage scholastic achievement by offering outstanding engineering technology students membership in the society. In order to allow members to succeed academically, the society keeps a list of scholarships on its website that members can apply to.

See also
 Association of College Honor Societies

References

External links
 
  ACHS Tau Alpha Pi entry

Association of College Honor Societies
Honor societies
Student organizations established in 1953
1953 establishments in Georgia (U.S. state)